Don or Donald Ritter may refer to:

 Donald L. Ritter (born 1940), U.S. Representative from Pennsylvania
 Donald Ritter, fictional character in Marvel Comics, see Donald & Deborah Ritter
 Don Ritter (artist) (born 1959), Canadian media artist